This is a list of destinations that AirTran Airways served at the time of their acquisition by Southwest Airlines and during the integration.

References

External links 
AirTran Airways Route Map
AirTran Airways City Information

Lists of airline destinations
AirTran Airways
Southwest Airlines